Theuns is a short form used in South Africa of the Dutch masculine given name Theunis, which like Teunis, it is a derivative of Anthonius (Anthony). Both Theunis and Theuns also exist as a patronymic surname. Notable people with this name include the following:

Given name
Theuns Eloff (born 1955), South African administrator
Theuns Fraser (born 1951), South African lawn bowler
Theuns Jordaan (born 1971), South African singer and songwriter
Theuns Kotzé (born 1987), Namibian rugby player
Theuns Stofberg (born 1955), South Africa rugby player

Nickname
Theuns Botha nickname for Theunis Louis Botha, South African politician

Surname
Edward Theuns (born 1991), Belgian cyclist
Jan Theuns (1877–1961), Dutch painter

See also

Theun de Vries (1907 – 2005), Dutch writer and poet
Theunis
Theus (surname)

Afrikaans-language given names
Afrikaans-language surnames